The port of Lobito is an Angolan port located in the city of Lobito, in the province of Benguela. It is connected to the commercial area of the city and the neighborhood of Canata. It is located in Lobito Bay, which is separated from the Atlantic Ocean by the Lobito Peninsula.

The port belongs to the Angolan government, which is responsible for its administration through the public company Porto do Lobito E.P.. This company was established to administer the license for terminals for loading and unloading, in addition to the passenger terminal.

Together with the ports of Luanda (Luanda), Moçamedes (Namibe), Soyo (Zaire) and Cabinda (Cabinda), it forms the largest port complexes in the country. It is the largest port in the center of the country.

The port is the outlet point of the Benguela railway, which carries cargo from the city of Tenke in the Democratic Republic of Congo. Another important outflow connection is made via the EN-100 highway.

References 

Lobito